Road 46 is a road across the Zagros Mountains, located in Hamadan Province and Kurdistan Province of western Iran.

Route
It connects Hamadan to Sanandaj and Marivan in Kurdistan Province. 

This road is part of Tehran-Sanandaj Road system.

See also

References

External links 

 Iran road map on Young Journalists Club

46
Transportation in Hamadan Province
Transportation in Kurdistan Province